Miguel Elías Camargo Cañizales (born 5 September 1993) is a Panamanian footballer who currently plays for Tauro.

Club career
After a few seasons on the books of Chorrillo, Camargo moved abroad to join Salvadoran side Águila in January 2015. He returned however to Chorrillo in June 2015.

New York City FC
On 11 January 2017, it was announced that Camargo would be joining MLS side New York City on loan, with an option to buy. He scored his first goal on 31 May, in a 2–2 draw with New England.

International career
Camargo made his debut for Panama in an August 2014 friendly match against Peru.

In May 2018, Camargo was named in Panama’s preliminary 35-man squad for the 2018 FIFA World Cup in Russia. However, he did not make the final 23.

International goals 
Scores and results list Panama's goal tally first.

References

External links

1993 births
Living people
Panama international footballers
Panamanian expatriate footballers
Panamanian footballers
Sportspeople from Panama City
C.D. Águila footballers
Unión Deportivo Universitario players
Club Deportivo Universidad de San Martín de Porres players
New York City FC players
Deportivo Táchira F.C. players
Major League Soccer players
Venezuelan Primera División players
Peruvian Primera División players
Liga Panameña de Fútbol players
2015 CONCACAF Gold Cup players
Copa América Centenario players
2017 CONCACAF Gold Cup players
2021 CONCACAF Gold Cup players
Association football midfielders
Expatriate footballers in El Salvador
Expatriate soccer players in the United States
Expatriate footballers in Venezuela
Expatriate footballers in Peru
Panamanian expatriate sportspeople in El Salvador
Panamanian expatriate sportspeople in the United States
Panamanian expatriate sportspeople in Venezuela
Panamanian expatriate sportspeople in Peru